Croweburg is an unincorporated community in Crawford County, Kansas, United States.  As of the 2020 census, the population of the community and nearby areas was 92.

History
Croweburg was a station on the Joplin & Pittsburg electric line. The settlement was named after Crowe Coal Company and consisted of four coal mining camps, which were in operation from 1900 to 1940. Until 1912, Croweburg was a sundown town, where African Americans were not allowed to live.

A post office was opened in Croweburg in 1908, and remained in operation until it was discontinued in 1972.

Demographics

For statistical purposes, the United States Census Bureau has defined Croweburg as a census-designated place (CDP).

References

Further reading

External links
 Crawford County maps: Current, Historic, KDOT

Unincorporated communities in Crawford County, Kansas
Unincorporated communities in Kansas
Sundown towns in Kansas